Joshua James Dixon (born 7 February 2001) is an English professional footballer footballer who plays as a midfielder for Carlisle United.

Career
Born in Carlisle, Dixon joined Carlisle United's youth academy at the age of 9. He started a two-year scholarship with the club in summer 2017, but suffered an anterior cruciate ligament injury shortly before the 2018–19 season, which ruled him out for most of the season. He was offered his first professional contract in April 2019, which was one year in length and signed the following month. In July 2019, his contract was extended by a year, lasting until summer 2021, though he suffered another anterior cruciate ligament injury later that month.

Dixon returned to first team training in summer 2020 and made his debut for Carlisle United as a first-half substitute in a 3–1 win over Aston Villa U21 on 17 November 2020 in the EFL Trophy.

On 25 January 2022, Dixon joined Northern Premier League Division One West side Workington on a one-month loan deal.

Career statistics

References

2001 births
Living people
English footballers
Footballers from Carlisle, Cumbria
Association football midfielders
Carlisle United F.C. players
Workington A.F.C. players
English Football League players
Northern Premier League players